Heine Åsen Larsen (born 9 July 2002) is a Norwegian footballer who plays as a midfielder for Egersund, on loan from Viking FK.

Career
He made his Eliteserien debut on 12 December 2021 against Tromsø. In March 2022, he was loaned out to Egersund.

References

2002 births
Living people
People from Stavanger
Norwegian footballers
Viking FK players
Egersunds IK players
Norwegian Third Division players
Norwegian Second Division players
Eliteserien players
Association football midfielders